Mahouton Norbert Hounkonnou is a Beninese Professor, mathematician, physicist and writer. He is professor of Mathematics and Physics at the University of Abomey-Calavi.

Biography 
He was born on June 7, 1956 in Adjohoun (Benin Republic), and is married to Baï Arlette Lidwine Elisha (Physicist), with three children.

His works have been cited over 1200 times per Google Scholar.

Selected works 

 2013, R (p, q)-calculus: differentiation and integration, MN Hounkonnou, J Désiré, B Kyemba, SUT J. Math 49 (2), 145-167
2012, Modeling the influence of local environmental factors on malaria transmission in Benin and its implications for cohort study, G Cottrell, B Kouwaye, C Pierrat, A Le Port, A Bouraïma, N Fonton, ..., PLOS ONE 7 (1), e28812
1992, Liquid chlorine in shear and elongational flows: A nonequilibrium molecular dynamics study, MN Hounkonnou, C Pierleoni, JP Ryckaert, The Journal of chemical physics 97 (12), 9335-9344

References

External links
 
 

1956 births
Living people
Beninese scientists
Fellows of the African Academy of Sciences